María Inés Patricia Elizabeth Pilatti Vergara (born 2 August 1958) is an Argentine politician, currently serving as a National Senator for Chaco Province since 2013. She previously served as a National Deputy from 2009 to 2013, elected in Chaco as well, and as a member of the Chaco Province Chamber of Deputies during two non-consecutive terms from 1997 to 2001 and from 2005 to 2009.

Early life and education
Pilatti Vergara was born on 2 August 1958 in Resistencia, Chaco Province. She finished high school at the Escuela de Comercio N°5 in Resistencia and studied law at the National University of the Northeast Faculty of Law and Social and Political Sciences.

Political career
Pilatti Vergara's political activism began in the Justicialist Party. She was elected to the Chaco Province Chamber of Deputies in 1997, serving until 2001, and then again in 2005, serving until 2009. As a provincial deputy, Pilatti Vergara was one of the most prominent opponents of then-Vice Governor of Chaco, Miguel Pibernus, who was forced to resign and arrested in 2001 on embezzlement charges. At the 2009 legislative elections, Pilatti Vergara was elected to the Argentine Chamber of Deputies in the Chaco Merece Más ("Chaco Deserves More"; the provincial name of the Front for Victory) list; she was sworn in as National Deputy on 10 December 2009, and served until the expiration of her term on 10 December 2013.

National Senator
At the 2013 legislative elections, Pilatti Vergara was the second candidate in the Front for Victory (FPV) list to the Argentine Senate in Chaco, and was comfortably elected as the list received 60.62% of the vote. She was sworn in on 28 November 2013, with her mandate beginning on 10 December 2013.

In 2016, Pilatti Vergara introduced legislation to aimed at protecting breast-feeding women; her bill would have mandated the creation of "public lactaries" and declared 12 July the "National Day for the Free Exercise of Maternal Breast-feeding". She also supported a 2019 initiative to introduce a travesti trans work quota in the Argentine national government; although the initiative was not debated in the Senate, a similar initiative was established by a decree issued by President Alberto Fernández in 2020.

She was re-elected for a second six-year term in 2019 as the second candidate in the Frente de Todos list in Chaco.

Pilatti Vergara voted consistently in favour of the Voluntary Interruption of Pregnancy bill, which legalized abortion in Argentina; the first such bill was struck down by her fellow senators on 8 August 2018, while the second was passed by the Senate on 30 December 2020.

She has been a member of the Council of Magistracy of the Nation in representation of the Senate since 6 February 2020.

Personal life
Pilatti Vergara resides in Resistencia; she is married and has two sons. In a 2020 interview, Pilatti Vergara stated that it was her son who convinced her to vote in favor of the legalization of abortion.

References

External links

1958 births
Living people
People from Resistencia, Chaco
Members of the Argentine Senate for Chaco
Members of the Argentine Chamber of Deputies elected in Chaco
Women members of the Argentine Senate
Women members of the Argentine Chamber of Deputies
Members of the Argentine Council of Magistracy
Members of the Chamber of Deputies of Chaco Province
Justicialist Party politicians
21st-century Argentine politicians
21st-century Argentine women politicians
National University of the Northeast alumni